Bovenkerk is a village in the municipality of Amstelveen in the province of North Holland, Netherlands. Bovenkerk was part of the municipality of Nieuwer-Amstel until 1964, when it was absorbed in the newly-formed municipality of Amstelveen. It lies on the western side of Amstelveen and next to the Amsterdam Forest.

Population
The statistical area of Bovenkerk, which also can include the surrounding countryside, has a population of 3040.

Sports
The Boro Formula One Team, founded by the brothers Bob and Rody Hoogenboom was based in Bovenkerk in 1976 and 1977.

References

Populated places in North Holland
Amstelveen